Simone Smith is a Scottish film director and film editor. She is possibly best known for her editing work on the film, Red which earned her the Best Editor accolade at the 2013 British Academy Scotland New Talent Awards.

Filmography

Awards and nominations

See also
2013 British Academy Scotland New Talent Awards

References

External links

Living people
British film editors
British Academy Scotland New Talent Award Winners
Scottish film editors
Year of birth missing (living people)
British women film editors